Ah Suytok Tutul Xiu or Ah Zuytok Tutul Xiu was the spiritual leader of the Maya  Tutul Xiu people. Founder of the city of Uxmal in the 7th century, he was from the Nonohual. Nonohual's location is unknown, but was probably in Peten, it also might have been another name for Potonchán in Tabasco or Tula. He was also known by his nickname coconut kaba or "Hun Uitzil Chac" ("the only mountain of Chac").

The Chilam Balam of Tizimín, describes Zuytok Ah Tutul Xiu as the founder of the city of Uxmal in the Katun 10 Ahau (669). However, the Chilam Balam of Mani describes the same fact in the Katun 2 Ahau (620).

Three centuries later the priestly house of Tutul-Xiu of Uxmal was part of the League of Mayapan.

Rulers of Tutul-Xiu